Sant'Andrea is a 12th-century Roman Catholic church building in the town of Gallicano, province of Lucca, region of Tuscany, Italy.

History
The church was initially built outside the city walls, on a road towards the valley. Subsequent reconstructions have altered the medieval structure, but not the layout.

References

Churches in Gallicano
12th-century Roman Catholic church buildings in Italy